John N. Browning (December 11, 1899 – November 17, 1981) was an American politician. He served as a Republican member of the South Dakota House of Representatives.

Life and career 
Browning was born in Fulda, Minnesota. He fought in World War I. He was a city commissioner for the Sioux Falls City Commission.

In 1927, Browning was elected to the South Dakota House of Representatives, representing Minnehaha County, South Dakota, serving until 1928.

Browning died in November 1981 in Minnehaha County, South Dakota, at the age of 81.

References 

1899 births
1981 deaths
People from Fulda, Minnesota
Republican Party members of the South Dakota House of Representatives
20th-century American politicians